An action axiom is an axiom that embodies a criterion for describing action. Action axioms are of the form "If a condition holds, then the following will be done".

On the action axiom
Decision theory and, hence, decision analysis are based on the maximum expected utility (MEU) action axiom. In general, the principle for action embodied by an action axiom (such as MEU) is highly defensible and its scope very broad.

The action-axiom is the basis of praxeology in the Austrian School, and it is the proposition that all specimens of the species Homo sapiens, the Homo agens, purposely utilize means over a period of time in order to achieve desired ends. In Human Action, Ludwig von Mises defined “action” in the sense of the action axiom by elucidating:

See also
Norm (artificial intelligence)

Notes

Expected utility